Civil law – a branch of the law. In common law countries such as England, Wales, and the United States, the term refers to non-criminal law. The law relating to civil wrongs and quasi-contracts is part of the civil law. The law of property is embraced by civil law. Civil law can, like criminal law, be divided into substantive law and procedural law. The rights and duties of individuals amongst themselves is the primary concern of civil law. It is often suggested that civil proceedings are taken for the purpose of obtaining compensation for injury, and may thus be distinguished from criminal proceedings, whose purpose is to inflict punishment. However, exemplary or punitive damages may be awarded in civil proceedings.

What type of thing is civil law? 

Civil law (in common law countries) can be described as all of the following:

 Branch of law dealing with non-criminal cases

Branches of civil law

Substantive civil law 

Substantive law
 Art and culture law
 Civil rights
 Commercial law
 Contract law
 Australian contract law
 Canadian contract law
 English contract law
 Scots contract law
 United States contract law
 Labor law
 Environmental law
 Family law
 Property law
 Cultural property law
 Intellectual property law
 Trust law
 Tort law
 Personal injury
 Tort law by common law country
 Tort law in Australia
 Canadian tort law
 English tort law
 Scots tort law
 United States tort law

Procedural civil law 
Procedural law
 Civil procedure

History of civil law 
 History of company law in the United Kingdom
 History of competition law
 History of English contract law
 History of equity and trusts
 History of labour law
 History of labor law in the United States
 History of labour law in the United Kingdom

Lawsuits 
 Lawsuit – suit, action, or cause instituted or depending between two private persons in the courts of law.

Civil procedure 
Civil procedure – body of law that sets out the rules and standards that courts follow when adjudicating civil lawsuits (as opposed to procedures in criminal law matters). These rules govern how a lawsuit or case may be commenced, what kind of service of process (if any) is required, the types of pleadings or statements of case, motions or applications, and orders allowed in civil cases, the timing and manner of depositions and discovery or disclosure, the conduct of trials, the process for judgment, various available remedies, and how the courts and clerks must function.
 Service of process
 Pleading – as practiced in countries that follow the English models, a pleading is a formal written statement of a party's claims or defenses to another party's claims in a civil action. The parties' pleadings in a case define the issues to be adjudicated in the action.
 pleading in England and Wales
 pleading in United States federal courts
 Motions
 Motion in United States law
 Court orders
 Depositions
 Discovery
 Trial
 Judgments
 Legal remedies

Civil procedure by region 

 Civil procedure in Brazil
 Civil procedure in Canada
 Civil procedure in England and Wales
 Civil Procedure Rules (CPR)
 Civil procedure in South Africa
 Civil procedure in the United States
 Federal Rules of Civil Procedure

Civil law publications 
 Journal of Tort Law

Persons influential in civil law 
 Oliver Wendell Holmes Jr.
 William Blackstone

See also 
 Outline of law

References

External links 

 Differences between Civil and Criminal Law in the USA
 Civil Cases in US Courts
 Civil Procedure Rules applying to England and Wales
 Complete text of Federal Rules of Civil Procedure (Cornell Univ.)

civil law
civil law
Civil law (common law)